Masamitsu (written: 正光, 正満, 成光, 政光, 将光 or 雅光) is a masculine Japanese given name. Notable people with the name include:

, Japanese baseball player
, Japanese daimyō
, Japanese sport wrestler
, Japanese footballer
, Japanese footballer
, Japanese politician
, Japanese politician
, Japanese scientist
, Japanese printmaker
, Japanese Go player

See also
47293 Masamitsu, a main-belt asteroid

Japanese masculine given names